In mathematics, the analytic Fredholm theorem is a result concerning the existence of bounded inverses for a family of bounded linear operators on a Hilbert space. It is the basis of two classical and important theorems, the Fredholm alternative and the Hilbert–Schmidt theorem. The result is named after the Swedish mathematician Erik Ivar Fredholm.

Statement of the theorem

Let  be a domain (an open and connected set). Let  be a real or complex Hilbert space and let Lin(H) denote the space of bounded linear operators from H into itself; let I denote the identity operator. Let  be a mapping such that

 B is analytic on G in the sense that the limit  exists for all ; and
 the operator B(λ) is a compact operator for each .

Then either

  does not exist for any ; or
  exists for every , where S is a discrete subset of G (i.e., S has no limit points in G).

References
  (Theorem 8.92)

Fredholm theory
Theorems in functional analysis
Theorems in complex analysis